Alarico Fernandes is a Timorese politician and independence activist. He was a member of FRETILIN National Committee in the mid-1970s.
Still a politician, he has served as Minister of Defence. Mari Alkatiri once stated of him that he "didn't have an ideology".

See also
Timorese Democratic Union

References

Fretilin politicians